Highland is a city in Madison County, Illinois, United States. The population was 9,991 at the 2020 census. Highland began as a Swiss settlement and derived its name from later German immigrants.

Highland is a sister city of Sursee in Switzerland.

Highland is a part of the Metro-East region of the Greater St. Louis metropolitan area.

History
Highland was settled in the early 19th century by Swiss-German settlers. The town was founded in 1837 and celebrated its 175th Jubilee in 2012. It was first named Helvetia (pronounced hellveesha) in accordance with the heritage of the town's Swiss-German founding members. The town voted to change its name to the English version, "Highland", in the early 20th century, as well as stopping production of its German language newspaper, in part to avoid negativity towards those of Germanic heritage at the advent of the First World War. Around the same time, a small town in northern Illinois also started calling itself Highland. Eventually, the town in northern Illinois became Highland Park.

Highland has a rich history including extended visits by such notables as Abraham Lincoln. On November 21, 1915, the Liberty Bell passed through Highland on its nationwide tour returning to Pennsylvania from the Panama–Pacific International Exposition in San Francisco.

Geography
U.S. Route 40 passes through the city north of downtown, leading west  to Troy and on to St. Louis, and to the northeast  to Greenville. Illinois Route 160 passes through the center of Highland, leading north  to Grantfork and south  to Trenton, while Illinois Route 143 leads northwest  to Marine and northeast  to Pierron. Interstate 70 passes through the northern part of the city limits, with access from Exit 24 (IL 143) to the west and Exit 30 (US 40) to the east.

The city drains to the south to Sugar Creek, a tributary of the Kaskaskia River, and to the northwest to the East Fork of Silver Creek, another tributary of the Kaskaskia. Highland Silver Lake is a reservoir constructed on the East Fork; the Highland city limits extend north  to the southern border of Grantfork to enclose the entire lake.

Economy
Highland has been home to businesses that include Pet Milk and the Wicks Organ Company. For the past 60 years, Highland Supply Corporation has been producing and selling floral grass - a traditional decorative product used to line Easter baskets. Highland is also home to The Korte Company (builder of many large and well-known buildings including Universal Studios in Florida).

Government
The current mayor is Kevin B. Hemann.

Highland is in the process of implementing citywide availability of a municipal broadband network using Fiber to the home technology.

Education
The Highland Community Unit School District serves Highland area students including those from Alhambra, Illinois, Grantfork, Illinois, and New Douglas, Illinois. Kindergarten through sixth grade schools are located in each of the districts municipalities while the district's middle and high schools are located in Highland.  Starting in August 2014 6th grade is located at the Highland Middle School.  In September 2014, the district's teachers staged a strike for the first time in the district's history.

Additionally, Highland has a local parochial school named St. Paul Catholic School offering Kindergarten through eighth grade education.

The Louis Latzer Memorial Public Library has a collection of more than 48,000 print volumes, a substantial media collection, and public computer access along with access to subscription databases and a genealogy collection. It is also a member of the Illinois Heartland Library System.

Demographics

As of the census of 2010, there were 9,919 people, 4,013 households, and 2,633 families residing in the city. The racial makeup of the city was 97.00% White, 0.2% African American, 0.2% Native American, 0.9% Asian, 0.4% from other races, and 1.3% from two or more races. Hispanic or Latino of any race were 1.4% of the population.

There were 4,013 households and 2,633 families. 50.3% of the families have children 18 years old or younger. There are 2,017 husband-wife families. 29.5% of all the households were made up of one   individual and 16.4% had someone living alone who was 65 years of age or older. The average household size was 2.42 and the average family size was 2.99.

In the city, the population was spread out, with 24.8% under the age of 18, 8.6% from 18 to 24, 27.5% from 25 to 44, 23% from 45 to 64, and 16.2% who were 65 years of age or older. The median age was 36.8 years. Of the total population 4,714 are males and 5,205 are females.

The median income for a household in the city was $39,524, and the median income for a family was $52,240. Males had a median income of $36,536 versus $25,620 for females. The per capita income for the city was $21,101. About 3.6% of families and 6.8% of the population were below the poverty line, including 6.9% of those under age 18 and 8.3% of those age 65 or over.

Mentions in popular media
Highland is the setting for the first song on the Illinois album by Sufjan Stevens, titled 'Concerning the UFO sighting near Highland, Illinois', in which Stevens mentions a 21st-century UFO sighting by the owner of the local mini-golf course.

Highland was also mentioned on The Daily Show on February 9, 2006. A report mentioned local pharmacist and state legislator Ron Stephens, who protested an executive order by Illinois Governor Rod Blagojevich requiring a pharmacist to fill emergency contraception prescriptions.

Notable people

Geoff Hartlieb, pitcher for the Pittsburgh Pirates; attended Highland High School; played at Lindenwood University
James Head, mixed martial artist in the Ultimate Fighting Championship
Arlo U. Landolt, astronomer
Sam LaPorta, football player for the University of Iowa
Ken Oberkfell, third baseman with six Major League Baseball teams; World Series champion (1982); born in Highland
Jake Odorizzi, Major League Baseball pitcher for the Kansas City Royals, Tampa Bay Rays, Minnesota Twins and Houston Astros; previously played for Highland High School
Harry Parker, pitcher for the St. Louis Cardinals, New York Mets and Cleveland Indians; born in Highland
Aaron Rakers, relief pitcher for the Baltimore Orioles and San Diego Padres; born in Highland

See also
Journey to New Switzerland

References

External links

 Swiss Settlers in SW Illinois—includes searchable English translations of 19th-century works by Swiss settlers in Highland.

Cities in Illinois
Cities in Madison County, Illinois
Swiss-American history